The Córas Iompair Éireann 181 Class locomotives were built in 1966 by General Motors Electro-Motive Division (EMD) and numbered B181 to B192.

These locomotives were virtually identical to the earlier 141 Class locomotives, but fitted with the more powerful 645 engine and thermostatically controlled engine cooling fan and inlet shutters. Delivery took place in 1966, with introduction into service happening a short time later.

Withdraw and preservation
All of the 181 class have been withdrawn, the first being 191 in 1991 after a runaway incident at Clonsilla; it was later scrapped in 1998. The last was 190 in November 2009 and has been preserved by the Irish Traction Group. In their final days they were only used on permanent way trains or as pilots.

Accidents and incidents
Fifteen people were injured.

Model 
Murphy Models commissioned Bachmann to produce an '00' gauge model of these locomotives. This model first was released in December 2007. It has been supplied in all four main liveries worn by the class.

References

External links 

 Eiretrains - Irish Locomotives
 Preserved 181 class loco No.190

Iarnród Éireann locomotives
Electro-Motive Division locomotives
Bo-Bo locomotives
5 ft 3 in gauge locomotives
Railway locomotives introduced in 1966
Diesel-electric locomotives of Ireland